

Local

Television

PMPC Star Awards for Television

Golden Screen TV Awards

USTv Students' Choice Awards

Dangal ng Bayan Awards

TUA Platinum Stallion Media Awards

Illumine Innovative Awards

Movies

FAMAS Awards

GMMSF Box-Office Entertainment Awards

Metro Manila Film Festival Awards

Gawad PASADO Awards

PMPC Star Awards for Movies

KAPPT Awards

Gawad Genio Awards

Other Fields

Anak TV Seal Awards

Rotary Club Golden Wheel Awards

PEP List Editors' Choice

ABS-CBN News Online

Summit Media

EdukCircle Awards

International

Television

SKAL Tourism Awards

New York Festival Awards

Asia Rainbow TV Awards

References

Lists of awards received by Filipino actor